The Xbox 360 gaming console has received updates from Microsoft from its launch in 2005 until November 2007 that enable it to play select games from its predecessor, Xbox. The Xbox 360 launched with backward compatibility with the number of supported Xbox games varying depending on region. Microsoft continued to update the list of Xbox games that were compatible with Xbox 360 until November 2007 when the list was finalized. Microsoft later launched the Xbox Originals program on December 7, 2007 where select backward compatible Xbox games could be purchased digitally on Xbox 360 consoles with the program ending less than two years later in June 2009. The following is a list of all backward compatible games on Xbox 360 under this functionality.

History

At its launch in November 2005, the Xbox 360 did not possess hardware-based backward compatibility with Xbox games due to the different types of hardware and architecture used in the Xbox and Xbox 360. Instead backward compatibility was achieved using software emulation. When the Xbox 360 launched in North America 212 Xbox games were supported while in Europe 156 games were supported. The Japanese market had the fewest titles supported at launch with only 12 games. Microsoft's final update to the list of backward compatible titles was in November 2007 bringing the final total to 461 Xbox games.

In order to use the backwards compatibility feature on Xbox 360 a hard drive is required. Updates to the list were provided from Microsoft as part of regular software updates via the Internet, ordering a disc by mail from the official website or downloading the update from the official website then burning it to either a CD or DVD. Subscribers to Official Xbox Magazine would also have updates to the backwards compatibility list on the demo discs included with the magazine.

Supported original Xbox games will run each with an emulation profile that has been recompiled for each game with the emulation profiles stored on the console's hard drive. Original Xbox games must use the original game disc and can not be installed to the hard drive unlike Xbox 360 games. Game saves and downloadable content cannot be transferred from an original Xbox to an Xbox 360. Xbox Live functionality for original Xbox games was available until April 15, 2010 until support for original Xbox games were discontinued. System link functionality between original Xbox and Xbox 360 remains available.

Microsoft launched the Xbox Originals program in December 2007 where Xbox 360 owners could purchase select original Xbox titles digitally if they did not own a game disc and such could be found inside their own section in the Xbox Live Marketplace. Beginning in June 2009 the branding was phased out and the games were moved to the "Games on Demand" section of the store with Microsoft stating that they have "finished its portfolio" of Xbox Originals.

During Microsoft's E3 2017 press conference on June 11, 2017, backward compatibility for original Xbox games on Xbox One family of consoles was announced. Part of the backward compatibility program for Xbox One will see original Xbox games be made available digitally in addition to owners of the original Xbox game disc. Prior to the first batch of original Xbox backward compatible titles for Xbox One were revealed six titles that were never released digitally as part of Xbox Originals program for Xbox 360 appeared in its "Games on Demand" store. Microsoft also confirmed that digital licenses would also carry over to Xbox One.

Game saves for original Xbox games that are backward compatible on both Xbox 360 and Xbox One cannot be transferred between the three generations. While Xbox Live functionality will not be available, Albert Penello, head of marketing for Xbox, explained users could "system link an original Xbox, an Xbox 360, an Xbox One and an Xbox One X for a four-player system-link LAN play with all original discs across three generations of consoles."

List of compatible Xbox games
There are  games made backward compatible out of  that were released for Xbox.

List of Xbox titles removed from backward compatibility list
The following Xbox titles listed below were initially announced as being backwards compatible with Xbox 360 that were later removed from the official list from Microsoft.

See also
 Xbox 360 system software
 List of backward-compatible games for Xbox One and Series X/S

Notes

References

External links
 Play original Xbox games on an Xbox 360 console (Xbox.com)

Backward compatibility
Xbox